Terastia is a genus of snout moths in the subfamily Spilomelinae of the family Crambidae. It was described by Achille Guenée in 1854 with Terastia meticulosalis as type species. The genus is currently placed in the tribe Margaroniini, where it is closely related to the genera Agathodes and Liopasia.

Terastia with its eight species is distributed in the tropical regions of the Neotropical, Afrotropical and Oriental realm as well as Australasia.

Like the closely related genera Agathodes and Liopasia, the caterpillars of Terastia species feed on Erythrina species (Fabaceae).

Species
Terastia africana Sourakov in Sourakov, Plotkin, Kawahara, Xiao, Hallwachs & Janzen, 2015
Terastia diversalis (Walker, 1866)
Terastia egialealis (Walker, 1859)
Terastia margaritis (C. Felder, R. Felder & Rogenhofer, 1875)
Terastia meticulosalis Guenée, 1854
Terastia minor Koningsberger & Zimmermann, 1901
Terastia proceralis Lederer, 1863
Terastia subjectalis Lederer, 1863

References

External links
Terastia at Markku Savela's Lepidoptera and Some Other Life Forms

Spilomelinae
Crambidae genera
Taxa named by Achille Guenée